Giorgos Markopoulos (born 1951) is a Greek poet. He read Economics and Statistics at the University of Piraeus (then Higher School for Industrial Studies).

He belongs to the so-called Genia tou 70, which is a literary term referring to Greek authors who began publishing their work during the 1970s, especially towards the end of the Greek military junta of 1967-1974 and at the first years of the Metapolitefsi.

He was awarded the State Prize for Poetry in 1999 for his collection, Μη σκεπάζεις το ποτάμι, which was also nominated for the European Union Prize in 2000. His work has been translated into English, French, Italian and Polish.

Selected poetry
Έβδομη Συμφωνία (Seventh Symphony), 1968
Η θλίψις του προαστίου (The Sadness of the Suburbs), 1976
Οι πυροτεχνουργοί (The Bomb Squad), 1979
Ποιήματα 1968–1987 (Poems 1968–1987), 1992
Mη σκεπάζεις το ποτάμι (Don't Cover the River), 1998

Notes

External links
His entry for the 2001 Frankfurt Book Fair (Greek)
His page at the website of the Hellenic Authors' Society (Greek)
His page at Kastaniotis publishers

1951 births
Living people
Modern Greek poets
20th-century Greek poets
People from Messini